Tenodera aridifolia is a species of mantis in the subfamily Mantinae. The Chinese mantis, T. sinensis, was once considered to be a subspecies of T. aridifolia, but the species can be distinguished by the shape of male genitalia.

Range
Tenodera aridifolia is distributed in China, Japan, Taiwan, India, Philippines, Myanmar, Thailand, Malaysia, Borneo and Indonesia.

Description
Males are 67–73mm in length, and females are 77–84mm.

Subspecies
There are two subspecies:
Tenodera aridifolia aridifolia (Stoll, 1813)
Tenodera aridifolia brevicollis (Breier, 1933)

Gallery

References

External links
Tenodera sinensis. Bugguide.net

Mantidae
Insects of Japan
Insects of China
Insects of Taiwan
Insects of Korea
Insects described in 1813
Articles containing video clips